The Men's Shot Put F33-34/52 had its Final held on September 12 at 17:00.

Medalists

Results

References
Final

Athletics at the 2008 Summer Paralympics